Bleyer is a surname. Notable people with the surname include:

Archie Bleyer (1909–1989), American bandleader and music industry executive
Eugen-Heinrich Bleyer (1896–1979), German Wehrmacht general
Julius Mount Bleyer (1859–1915), American physician
Kevin Bleyer, American comedy writer
Matthias Bleyer (born 1978), German pair skater
Pedro Bleyer (born 1968), Bolivian fencer

See also
 
 Bleier
 Bleiler